In its 108-year history, the Minnesota Twins baseball franchise of Major League Baseball's American League has employed 31 managers. The duties of the manager include team strategy and leadership on and off the field. Eight of these team managers have been "player-managers", all during the Washington Senators era; specifically, they managed the team while still playing for it.

The Minnesota franchise began its life as the Washington Senators in Washington, D. C., where they played from their inception in 1901 to 1960. In the early twentieth century, the Senators were managed consecutively by three future members of the National Baseball Hall of Fame, bookended by Bucky Harris, who managed the team from 1924 to 1928 and again from 1935 to 1942. Walter Johnson managed the team for four seasons from 1929 to 1932, and he was followed by Joe Cronin, who led for the next two seasons (1933–1934). In 1960, the American League awarded an expansion franchise to Minneapolis, Minnesota; however, owner Calvin Griffith moved his team to Minnesota, and Washington was awarded the expansion team instead. Thus, the Minnesota Twins began play at Metropolitan Stadium in Bloomington, Minnesota the following year, during the tenure of manager Cookie Lavagetto, and played at the Hubert H. Humphrey Metrodome in downtown Minneapolis from 1982 to 2009. Under manager Ron Gardenhire, the team moved to Target Field beginning in the 2010 season.

Seven managers have taken the franchise to the postseason, with Gardenhire leading them to five playoff appearances, the most in their franchise history. Two managers have won World Series championships with the franchise: Bucky Harris, in the 1924 World Series against the New York Giants; and Tom Kelly, in the 1987 World Series against the St. Louis Cardinals and 1991 against the Atlanta Braves. Harris is also the longest-tenured manager in their franchise history, with 2,776 games of service in parts of 18 seasons between 1924 and 1954; he is followed by Kelly, who managed 2,386 games over 16 seasons from 1986 to 2001.  The manager with the highest winning percentage in team history is Billy Martin, who managed the team in 1969 and achieved a record of 97–65 (.599). Conversely, the manager with the lowest winning percentage is Malachi Kittridge, whose winning percentage of .059 was achieved with a record of 1–16 in the first half of 1904. Kittridge's tenure is also the shortest in team history.

Table key

Managers

Footnotes
#: running total of the number of Twins managers. Thus, any manager who has two or more separate terms is only counted once.
Tom Kelly won the Manager of the Year Award in 1991.
Ron Gardenhire won the Manager of the Year Award in 2010.
Paul Molitor won the Manager of the Year Award in 2017.

References
General references

In-text citations

 
Minnesota Twins
Managers